Giancarlo Gallifuoco (born 12 January 1994) is an Australian professional footballer who plays as a defender for Malaysia Super League club Kuala Lumpur City.

Born in Sydney, Gallifuoco played under 23's football for Tottenham Hotspur and Swansea City before making his professional debut for Melbourne Victory in 2015. In 2016, he returned to England to play for Torquay United. In July 2017, Gallifuoco signed for Dover Athletic. In the Summer of 2018, Gallifuoco joined Serie C side FC Rieti where he remained until December 2018.

Gallifuoco played for Australia numerous times at youth level.

Club career

Tottenham Hotspur
Gallifuoco signed a -year deal with Tottenham Hotspur in February 2012. In his first season with the club he became a regular in the Tottenham under-21 side, alongside fellow Australian Massimo Luongo. He also experienced first-team football in a friendly win over Enfield Town in August 2013.

Swansea City
In August 2014, Gallifuoco signed a one-year deal with Swansea City. He played predominately with the under-21 side, including victory in the 2014–15 Professional U21 Development League 2. Gallifuoco was released by Swansea at the end of the 2014–15 season.

Melbourne Victory
Gallifuoco next returned to Australia, joining A-League side Melbourne Victory in September 2015. He made his senior competitive debut one month later, in a win over Hume City in the semifinals of the 2015 FFA Cup. He left the Victory at the end of the season seeking more game time, after only limited first-team opportunities (six appearances across all competitions).

Torquay United
Gallifuoco then returned to England, signing with National League side Torquay United in August 2016, Gallifuoco played a pivotal role in their survival in the league with 35 starts and 3 goals.

Dover Athletic
In July 2017 Gallifuoco moved to rival National League side Dover Athletic on a one-season deal. He made his debut in a 1–0 away victory to Hartlepool United on 5 August 2017. He scored his first goal in a 2–0 away victory over Aldershot Town meeting a near-post cross from Nortei Nortey following a short-corner, diverting his header into the far-bottom corner.

FC Rieti
Gallifuoco joined Serie C outfit F.C. Rieti at the start of the 2018–2019 season, before departing on 23 December 2018 citing personal reasons.

Western Sydney Wanderers
In March 2019, Gallifuoco returned to Australia, signing with A-League club Western Sydney Wanderers as an injury replacement player. He made his debut for the Wanderers as a late substitute in their 4–1 win over Brisbane Roar FC on 8 March 2019. He was released by the club in May 2019.

Central Coast Mariners
In May 2019, Gallifuoco was signed by Central Coast Mariners. He was released on the deadline day of the January transfer window.

Return to Melbourne Victory
On 2 February 2020, Gallifuoco rejoined Melbourne Victory for the remainder of the 2019–20 season.

Kuala Lumpur City
Gallifuoco joined Malaysia Super League club Kuala Lumpur City in February 2021. He was part of the team that won the 2021 Malaysia Cup.

Career statistics

Honours

Club 

Swansea City
 Professional Development League 2: 2014–15

Kuala Lumpur City
 Malaysia Cup: 2021
 AFC Cup runner-up: 2022

References

External links
 

Living people
1994 births
Soccer players from Sydney
Association football defenders
Australia under-20 international soccer players
Australia youth international soccer players
Australian people of Italian descent
Melbourne Victory FC players
Torquay United F.C. players
Dover Athletic F.C. players
F.C. Rieti players
Western Sydney Wanderers FC players
Central Coast Mariners FC players
Kuala Lumpur City F.C. players
A-League Men players
National League (English football) players
Serie C players
Malaysia Super League players
Expatriate footballers in Wales
Australian expatriate sportspeople in England
Australian expatriate soccer players
Expatriate footballers in England
Expatriate footballers in Italy
Expatriate footballers in Malaysia
Australian expatriate sportspeople in Italy
Australian expatriate sportspeople in Wales
Australian expatriate sportspeople in Malaysia
Australian soccer players